This is a list of electoral results for the electoral district of Doveton in Victorian state elections.

Members

Election results

Elections in the 1980s

References

Victoria (Australia) state electoral results by district